Cyphophoenix nucele is a species of flowering plant in the family Arecaceae. It is found only in New Caledonia.

References

nucele
Endemic flora of New Caledonia
Critically endangered plants
Taxonomy articles created by Polbot